The Dodge Kingsway is an automobile built by Dodge for export markets. The Kingsway name was adopted for the 1940 models. Before that, the export models based on Plymouth models had no unique model names.

Kingsways were rebadged Plymouth vehicles, although they were often equipped with Dodge bumpers and trim. They were supposed to help overseas Dodge dealers to sell cars in a lower price class. The first export models were made in 1935, and they continued through the 1959 model year, with many different body styles and variations depending on the market they were intended for and which Plymouth models were available at the time. They were built in either Detroit, Michigan, or in Windsor, Ontario, Canada.

Versions
The Kingsway was the lowest-priced Plymouth Deluxe model in 1949-52 ( wheelbase), 1954-58 (based on Plymouth Plaza series) and 1959 (Plymouth Savoy). The Kingsway DeLuxe was based on the Plymouth DeLuxe (1946–50,  wheelbase), Cambridge (1951–53), Savoy (1954–58) and Belvedere (1959). The top line Kingsway Custom was Dodge's version of the Plymouth Special DeLuxe (1946–50), Cranbrook (1951–53), Belvedere (1954–58) and Fury (1959). For 1959 only, the Kingsway offered a model based on the Sport Fury, the Kingsway Lancer.

With the introduction of the Dodge Dart for 1960, the Kingsway line was dropped.

Introduction
The first use of the Kingsway name was in Canada for the 1940 model year (model D14), basically Dodge's rebadged version of the Plymouth. The base model came with one taillamp, one sunvisor and one windshield wiper - all on the driver's side. The body was Plymouth with Dodge nameplates, hood ornament and a grille that fit the Plymouth front end. Body styles were business coupe, 2-door and 4-door sedans.

The Kingsway name continued for the 1941 model year, on model D20. It was now available in two versions, base and Special. The Special was about $25 more than the base model. Body styles offered were the same as in 1940 with the addition of a 5-passenger coupe with fold-up (auxiliary) seats in the rear compartment.

For the 1942 model year, the Kingsway name was replaced by the DeLuxe, the same name as used on the base model Plymouth series. The DeLuxe was also the lowest priced Dodge for Canada from 1946 to 1950, although other export markets continued to use the Kingsway moniker.

Chrysler of Canada reintroduced the Kingsway name to the Canadian market for the 1951 model year, as the Canadian Dodge rebadged version of the Plymouth Concord, and replaced the DeLuxe name used on 111" wheelbase models in 1949-50.

The 1951 Kingsway offered a 2-door business coupe, 2-door fastback sedan, 2-door Suburban wagon and a 2-door Savoy wagon.  The Savoy used interior and exterior trim similar to that used on higher priced models. The business coupe was dropped for the 1952 model year.  As with the Plymouth Concord, the Canadian Dodge Kingsway was dropped for 1953.

The Kingsway, along with the Plymouth Savoy, were also assembled in India by Premier Automobiles until the late 1950s.

Australian production
Chrysler Australia released the D43 series Kingsway in 1953 with all major panels pressed in Australia on Australian-made tooling. D49 series Kingsways were assembled from 1954 to 1957. The D49 Kingsway differed only in terms of grilles and badgework from the Plymouth P25 and DeSoto SP25 Diplomat models  which were also assembled by Chrysler Australia. An Australian developed coupe utility variant of the Kingsway was introduced in 1956.

Swedish production
In Sweden, Dodge Kingway cars were fitted between 1955 and 1957 at Aktiebolaget Nyköpings Automobilfabriks (ANA) factory in Norrköping.

References

 Motor Vehicle Data Book, 1948 edition
 Canadian Dodge sales material

See also

Kingsway
Cars of Canada
1930s cars
1940s cars
1950s cars